Nanorana rostandi (common names: Dubois' paa frog, Rostand's paa frog, Dubois' frog) is a species of frog in the family Dicroglossidae. It is endemic to western Nepal.
It is a rare species found near high-altitude streams, springs, and other running waters within forests and grasslands. 
It is threatened by habitat loss due to subsistence wood collecting.

References

rostandi
Amphibians of Nepal
Endemic fauna of Nepal
Taxonomy articles created by Polbot
Amphibians described in 1974